Sclerolaena eurotioides is a species of flowering plant in the family Amaranthaceae, native to Western Australia. It was first described in 1869 by Ferdinand von Mueller as Echinopsilon eurotioides, but was transferred to the genus, Sclerolaena in 1978 by Andrew John Scott.

References

External links
Scleroalaena eurotioides occurrence data from GBIF

eurotioides
Endemic flora of Australia
Flora of Western Australia
Plants described in 1869
Taxa named by Ferdinand von Mueller